Tavernola Bergamasca is a comune (municipality) in the Province of Bergamo in the Italian region of Lombardy, located about  northeast of Milan and about  east of Bergamo.

Tavernola Bergamasca borders the following municipalities: Iseo, Monte Isola, Parzanica, Predore, Vigolo.

Demographic evolution

References